The Our Lady of Lourdes Chapel, Shamian Island is a 20th-century gothic church. It is located in Shamian, Liwan District of Guangzhou, Guangdong, China.

History
The church was built in 1890 by the French government. During the ten-year Cultural Revolution, religious activities in the church was forced to cease. After the 3rd Plenary Session of the 11th Central Committee of the Communist Party of China, according to the national policy of free religious belief, it was officially reopened to the public on December 8, 1982. It was repaired and renovated before the 2010 Asian Games.

References

Churches in Guangzhou
1890 establishments in China
Roman Catholic churches completed in 1890
Gothic Revival church buildings in China
Tourist attractions in Guangzhou
Roman Catholic cathedrals in China
19th-century Roman Catholic church buildings in China